Odomsith Singlatsomboun (born 10 May 1989) is a Laotian professional footballer who plays as a defender for Champasak in the Lao League 1.

External links 
 

1989 births
Living people
Laotian footballers
Laos international footballers
Association football defenders